Sicyopus auxilimentus is a species of goby endemic to the Philippines where it is only known to occur in Lagu Lagu Creek on Leyte Island.  This species can reach a length of  SL.

References

auxilimentus
Freshwater fish of the Philippines
Taxonomy articles created by Polbot
Fish described in 1994